Mount Tao, Tao Mountain is  mountain located in the north of the Wuling Farm and is  one of Snow Mountains group. The mountain is ranked no No. 44 in Taiwan hiking declination scale; Borders with Ridge Jianshi, Hsinchu County, Taichung City, Heping District, Marked with Peakpoint label no. 6327. In local Atayal language the mountain is known as "B'bu Qba", meaning "fist Hill". In Chinese the name translates as "Peach" mountain, due to the view from southwest side.

Climbing routes

There are several climbing paths towards Tao Shan. The simplest is through the Wuling four show route, starting from Sancha camp. There is also another path that directly goes up to Tao Shan, which starts from Tao Shan waterfall park.

See also
100 Peaks of Taiwan
List of mountains in Taiwan
Shei-Pa National Park

Landforms of Hsinchu County
Tao
Mountaineering in Taiwan